The Sokol Auditorium is located at 2234 South 13th Street in the Little Bohemia neighborhood of South Omaha, Nebraska. It is a local icon for its historical context, as well as modern musical performances and gymnastics. It has a maximum capacity of 1,500.

Located below the auditorium is the Sokol Underground, where numerous concert promoters such as Hunt Industries host many rock and hip hop concerts.

Sokol has been purchased and is now owned operated by 1% Productions. This venue is now called The Admiral Theatre, named after the defunct Omaha movie theater of the same name.

History
Sokol Auditorium was built in 1926 at the corner of South 13th Street and Martha Street to house many of Omaha's Czech community’s social activities. Sokols were fraternal (and sororal) organizations founded in Bohemia to promote equality, harmony, and fraternity. As one of four in Omaha, the Sokol Auditorium was utilized for meetings by twenty-five Bohemian lodges as well as ethnic Italians and American groups. The hall also offered recreation classes for its members.

The Sokol Auditorium in Omaha was one of many such buildings built as part of the Sokol movement. In 1862, a highly educated young intellectual, Dr. Miroslav Tyrš (1832-1884) founded Sokol.  His goal was to develop physically strong and mentally alert citizens, and to instill in them a deep love for national freedom from volunteer exercise and discipline.

Sokols have been prominent in the Olympic Games for many years. Sokol Omaha sent Phil Cahoy and James Hartung as members of the 1980 Olympic team; Hartung competed again in 1984.

Legacy
The Sokol Auditorium has been mentioned specifically in a number of songs from the last twenty years. The Faint mentions the Sokol in the song, "Amorous in Bauhaus Fashion," from the album Media. They Might Be Giants wrote the song, "Sokol Auditorium," about the venue. Neva Dinova's music video for "Yellow Datsun," was filmed at the Auditorium, and Johnny Rioux of the Street Dogs collapsed on stage on February 27, 2007 of an apparent seizure while his band was opening for Flogging Molly.

See also
Music in Omaha

References

External links
Sokol Omaha
Sokol Auditorium
Sokol Underground

Map:

1862 establishments in Nebraska Territory
Czech-American history
Music venues in Omaha, Nebraska
History of South Omaha, Nebraska
Theatres in Omaha, Nebraska
Czech-American culture in Omaha, Nebraska
Sokol in the United States